Naila Nayem  is a Bangladeshi model and actress. She entered show business as a runway model  and then became an actress.

Early life
Nayem was born in Barisal, Bangladesh. She completed a Bachelor of Dental Surgery (BDS) at Dhaka City Dental College, a private medical college, to become a dentist.

Career
Besides modeling, Nayem works in TV. and film. She established her acting career by working on the movie Run Out. She acted in Bangla drama Ghat Babu Nitai Candra in 2013 which was based on Sunil Gangopadhyay's novel Ghat Babu. She performed in an item song. She was signed to appear in upcoming film Maruf Taka Dhorena.

Naila used social media to promote herself although according to her, she never thought of using Facebook. She was hired as the campaign image of Foodpanda. She performed an item song in the movie Run Out. She performed on Ananta Jolil in a programme organized by Grameenphone. In 2015 she starred in an award-winning commercial by Bagher Bachcha Digital for LG electronics. Her commercial with Bangladeshi cricketer Sabbir Rahman, promoting a non-alcoholic malt beverage, was banned by the Bangladesh Cricket Board. She starred in a web series called The List by CMV.

Personal life 
Naila's ex-husband, Tawsif Hossain Tushar, joined the Islamic State in Syria and appeared in a recruitment video for them.

Works

Music video
 Vote For Thot (with Pritom Ahmed)
 City Over Night
 Bondhu Tumi Jano Na Koto Valobashi Tomake (with Taposh)
 Baby Doll
 Assam Jabo

Movies
 Run Out
 Maruf Taka Dhorena
 Ratrir Jaatri

Dramas
 Ghat Babu Nitai Candra (2013)
 Masti Unlimited (2015)

References

External links
 

1981 births
Living people
Bangladeshi female models
Bangladeshi television actresses
Bangladeshi film actresses
Bangladeshi dentists
Bengali television actresses
People from Chittagong
Bangladeshi actresses
North South University alumni